Dattatraya Parashuram Karmarkar, known as D. P. Karmarkar (20 July 1902 – 20 June 1991) was an Indian politician and Union government minister.

Life
Karmarkar was educated at Karnatak College Dharwar, Deccan College and the ILS Law College, from which he qualified as a lawyer. He served in the Central Legislative Assembly from 1945 to 1947, and became a member of the Provisional Parliament in 1951. In 1952, he was elected to the 1st Lok Sabha as a member of the Indian National Congress from the constituency of Dharwad North, holding this seat until the 1962 general election.

From August 1950 to May 1952, Karmarkar was a deputy commerce minister in the Union government, with the additional responsibilities of a deputy trade minister from May to August 1952. He was given cabinet rank in August 1952 and served as Commerce Minister until June 1956. He then served as Minister of State for Trade until April 1957, and was then appointed Minister of State (Health), serving in this role until the dissolution of the third Nehru ministry in April 1962. He was appointed to the Rajya Sabha on 3 April 1962 and served until 2 April 1968, during which time he was chairman of the House Committee from 1964 to 1966.

References

|-

1902 births
1991 deaths
Indian National Congress politicians from Karnataka
Lok Sabha members from Karnataka
India MPs 1952–1957
India MPs 1957–1962
Rajya Sabha members from Karnataka
Health ministers of India